Te Arawa is a confederation of Māori iwi and hapu (tribes and sub-tribes) of New Zealand who trace their ancestry to the Arawa migration canoe (waka). The tribes are based in the Rotorua and Bay of Plenty areas and have a population of around 60,117 according to the 2018 census making it the 6th biggest iwi in New Zealand.  The Te Arawa iwi also comprises 56 hapū (sub-tribes) and 31 mārae (family groupings).

History

The history of the Te Arawa people is inextricably linked to the Arawa canoe.

The Te Arawa tribes have a close historical interest in the lakes around Rotorua.

Many Te Arawa men fought for the Colonial Government in the New Zealand Wars that occurred in the mid-19th century in the North Island of New Zealand. Perhaps in part, for this reason, the iwi chose to negotiate directly with the New Zealand Government over their historical grievances, bypassing the Waitangi Tribunal. A series of negotiations has resulted in several settlements of their various claims, the largest of which involve the settlement relating to the 14 lakes, signed in December 2004, and the settlement for all the historical claims of a cluster of Te Arawa iwi and hapu signed on 30 September 2006.  The Government apologised to Te Arawa for breaches of the Treaty and paid $36 million in compensation, including up to 500 km² of Crown forest land, as well as 19 areas of special significance, including the Whakarewarewa Thermal Springs Reserve.

On 18 December 2015 Te Arawa gained the right to vote in committee meetings of the Rotorua Lakes Council via an iwi partnership board, Te Tatau o Te Arawa.

Te Arawa FM is the radio station of Te Arawa iwi, including Ngāti Pikiao, Tūhourangi and Ngāti Whakaue. It was established in the early 1980s and became a charitable entity in November 1990. The station underwent a major transformation in 1993, becoming Whanau FM. One of the station's frequencies 99.1 was taken over by Mai FM in 1998; the other became Pumanawa 89FM before later reverting to Te Arawa FM.

Constituent iwi and hapu
The iwi and hapu that constitute Te Arawa include:

Ngati Whakaue, Ngati Rangiteaorere, Ngati Pikiao, Ngati Makino, Ngati Rangitihi, Ngati Rangiwewehi, Tapuika, Waitaha, Ngati Ngararanui, Ngati Rongomai, Ngati Tahu, Ngati Whaoa, Ngati Tarawhai, Ngati Te Roro o Te Rangi, Ngati Kea Ngati Tuara, Ngati Tura-Ngati Te Ngakau, Ngati Uenukukōpako, Tūhourangi, Ngati Wahiao Ngati Manawa, and Ngati Tuwharetoa.

References

External links
Te Arawa website